Mishti doi is a fermented sweet doi (yogurt) originating from the Bengal region of the Indian subcontinent and common in the Indian states of West Bengal, Tripura, Assam's Barak Valley, and in the nation of Bangladesh. It is made with milk and sugar or jaggery. It differs from the plain yogurt because of the technique of preparation. There are many variations of mishti doi according to their popularity. Sweet curd of Nabadwip, Kolkata, Bogra, etc are very popular.

Mishti doi is prepared by boiling milk until it is slightly thickened, sweetening it with sugar, either gura (brown sugar) or khejur gura (date molasses), and allowing the milk to ferment overnight. Earthenware is always used as the container for making mitha dahi because the gradual evaporation of water through its porous walls not only further thickens the yoghurt, but also produces the right temperature for the growth of the culture. Very often the yoghurt is delicately seasoned with a pinch of cardamom for fragrance. Baked yogurt is a similar preparation in the west.

Before the discovery of miracle drugs of typhoid, wellknown alopathic physicians like Dr. B. C. Roy, Col. Denham White and Nilratan Sircar prescribed mishti doi for their patients which helps to accumulate Vitamin Bs.

References

Bangladeshi desserts
Sweets of West Bengal
Bengali desserts
Yogurt-based dishes
Bengali cuisine